Nehru Maidan  or Oil India Ground is a multi-purpose sport stadium used mostly for football matches, located in  Duliajan, Assam. The ground is owned and managed by Oil India.

It is the home ground of Oil India FC. It has hosted a number of national and state level football tournaments. District level cricket tournaments have also been hosted here. It has a capacity of 4,000 people.

References

External links 
 Official AIFF website
 Official site of Oil India Ltd.

Football venues in Assam
Sports venues in Assam
Dibrugarh district
1984 establishments in Assam
Sports venues completed in 1964
20th-century architecture in India